Harriet Scott may refer to: 
 Harriet Scott (broadcaster) (born 1972), British broadcaster
 Harriet Anne Scott (1816–1894), British novelist
 Harriet Scott (footballer) (born 1993), Irish footballer
 Harriet Scott (nurse) (1833–1915), Union nurse during the American Civil War
 Harriet Robinson Scott (1820–1876), African American abolitionist wife of Dred Scott
 Harriet Morgan (née Scott, 1830–1907) Australian natural history illustrator